The 2nd National Film Awards, then known as State Awards for Films, presented by Ministry of Information and Broadcasting, India to felicitate the best of Indian Cinema released in the year 1954. Ceremony took place at Vigyan Bhavan, New Delhi on 21 December 1955 and awards were given by then President of India, Dr. Rajendra Prasad.

With the increasing number of films made in India, couple of new awards were introduced. Starting with 2nd National Film Awards, awards were divided into feature film and non-feature film awards. Feature films were, again, awarded at All India and Regional level. Awards were given to seven regional language films which are in Bengali, Hindi, Kannada, Malayalam, Marathi, Tamil and Telugu.

At All India level, Children's films were awarded with its own category where awards were categorised as Prime Minister's Gold Medal and Certificate of Merit. For all other categories, awards were given as President's Gold Medal and Certificate of Merit. Regional films were awarded with President's Silver Medal for Best Feature Film and Certificate of Merit. Non-feature film awards were awarded for documentaries made in the country.

Juries 

Three different committees were formed based on the film making sectors in India, mainly based in Bombay, Calcutta and Madras. Another committee for all India level was also formed which included some of the members from regional committee. For 2nd National Film Awards, central committee was headed by R. R. Diwakar.

 Jury Members: Central
 R. R. Diwakar (Chairperson)N. K. SiddhantaT. M. Narayanaswami PillaiM. D. BhatKamaladevi ChattopadhyaySatyavati MallikSyed NurullahS. S. VasanV. ShantaramR. SubbaraoArdhendu Mukerjee
 Jury Regional: Bombay
 M. D. Bhat (Chairperson)Kusumavati DeshpandeM. R. PalandeMoti ChandraBhagwati Charan VermaV. K. GokakVijay BhattKishore SahuJagdish Sethi
 Jury Regional: Calcutta
 N. K. Siddhanta (Chairperson)Sabita DeviKalidas NagO. C. GangulySudhir MukerjeeK. L. Chattarjee
 Jury Regional: Madras
 T. M. Narayanaswami Pillai (Chairperson)ManjubhashiniMu. VaradarajanR. SubbaraoB. Ramakrishna RajuAiyapanA. RamaiahK. Ramnath

Awards 

Awards were divided into feature films and non-feature films.

President's Gold Medal for the All India Best Feature Film is now better known as National Film Award for Best Feature Film, whereas President's Gold Medal for the Best Documentary Film is analogous to today's National Film Award for Best Non-Feature Film. For children's films, Prime Minister's Gold Medal is now given as National Film Award for Best Children's Film. At the regional level, President's Silver Medal for Best Feature Film is now given as National Film Award for Best Feature Film in a particular language. Certificate of Merit in all the categories is discontinued over the years.

Feature films 

Feature films were awarded at All India as well as regional level. For the 2nd National Film Awards, in this category, Mirza Ghalib, a biographical Hindi / Urdu film, based on the life of well-known poet Mirza Ghalib, along with a Malayalam film, Neelakuyil won the maximum number of awards (two), with former also winning the President's Gold Medal for the All India Best Feature Film. Following were the awards given:

All India Award 

For 2nd National Film Awards, none of the films were awarded from Children's films category as no film was found to be suitable.

Regional Award 

The awards were given to the best films made in the regional languages of India. For 2nd National Film Awards, awards were given in seven regional language films which are in Bengali, Hindi, Kannada, Malayalam, Marathi, Tamil and Telugu.

Non-Feature films 

Non-feature film awards were given for the documentaries made in the country. Following were the awards given:

Documentaries

Awards not given 

Following awards were not given as no film was found to be suitable for the award:

 Prime Minister's Gold Medal for the Best Children's Film
 President's Silver Medal for Best Feature Film in Kannada

References

External links 
 National Film Awards Archives
 Official Page for Directorate of Film Festivals, India

National Film Awards (India) ceremonies
1955 in Indian cinema
1955 film awards